Bucket of B-Sides Vol. 1 is a 2005 compilation album released by American hip hop record label Definitive Jux. It featured tracks which had appeared as B-sides on some of the label's previously issued singles and EPs.

Track listing

Personnel
Credits adapted from liner notes.

 Breeze – vocals (1)
 Q-Unique – vocals (1)
 Godfather Don – vocals (1)
 J-Treds – vocals (1)
 MF Doom – vocals (1)
 El-P – vocals (3, 8, 13), production (1, 3, 4, 7, 13)
 C-Rayz Walz – vocals (2)
 Dub-L – production (2)
 Masai Bey – vocals (4)
 Vast Aire – vocals (4, 7, 9, 11, 13)
 BMS – vocals (4)
 Aesop Rock – vocals (5, 11)
 RJD2 – production (5, 9, 11, 14)
 Camu Tao – vocals (6, 8, 13), production (6)
 Vordul Mega – vocals (7, 9)
 Alaska – vocals (8, 10)
 Windnbreeze – vocals (8, 10)
 Rob Sonic – vocals (8)
 Cryptic One – vocals (8)
 Murs – vocals (8, 11)
 Pawl – production (8)
 Blockhead – production (10)
 Blueprint – vocals (11)
 Mr. Lif – vocals (12), production (12)
 DJ Fakts One – additional vocals (12), turntables (12)
 Cage – vocals (13)
 Copywrite – vocals (13)

External links
 

2005 compilation albums
Definitive Jux compilation albums
Albums produced by Blockhead (music producer)
Albums produced by El-P
Albums produced by RJD2
B-side compilation albums
Record label compilation albums
East Coast hip hop compilation albums